Kornelije "Bata" Kovač (1 January 1942 – 13 September 2022) was a Serbian composer.

Early life

Born in Niš during World War II in the Nazi-occupied Serbia to a Hungarian father and a Serbian mother, Kovač grew up in a prominent artistic family - his grandfather was a conductor, his father a music professor and a violinist, his mother a singer in the opera choir.

Kovač received his early music education at the College of Music in Subotica, after which he attempted to enroll in the Belgrade Music Academy. He did not pass the entrance exam so he entered the Sarajevo Music Academy of University of Sarajevo where he graduated from the Theory And Piano Department.

Career

A composer, pianist, keyboard player, producer and arranger, Kovač's career as a professional musician started in 1961, when he formed his first band, BKB, which became a prominent jazz trio at the time. In 1963 they entered The Yu Jazz Festival, that took place in Bled (Slovenia).

After conducting the various orchestras in Bosnia, he finally joined Sarajevo's most popular pop band Indeksi. With them he had a two-month-long tour in Russia. In 1968, he moved to the Yugoslav capital, Belgrade, where he founded Korni Grupa. As a composer and a musician, he won many music contests that took place in former Yugoslavia. With Korni Grupa he entered following music festivals in Europe:
1969 - Singing Europe (Netherlands), voted the most original entry
1970 - Rock Festival Katowice (Poland)
1972 - Montreux (Switzerland)
1974 - Eurovision Song Festival (Brighton, United Kingdom)

In 1978, Kovač moved to England where he collaborated in various projects, such as: the 1978 Reading Rock Festival as the keyboardist of the Jenny Darren Band. Among the prominent British musicians with whom Kovač worked while in the UK, included:
 Bernie Marsden, guitar player of "White Snake"
 Hans Zimmer, composer
 Paul Jones, ex-singer of Manfred Mann
 Andy Pask, bass player of Landscape

Later projects

Kovač wrote music for theatre, movies and television. His songs were released on LP-s in Yugoslavia, Spain, France, the United States, the Netherlands, Sweden, Finland, Norway etc. Many of them were Golden or Platinum Records. From 1979, he participated in projects in Spain, as a producer, composer or arranger.

Personal life and death
Until her death in 2005, he was married to Spomenka Stojanović, with whom he had three daughters: Aleksandra, Kristina (both of whom are also involved with music) and Anja. 

On 19 January 2011, Serbian broadcaster RTS announced that Kovač and his two daughters, Aleksandra and Kristina, would each compose a song and present a singer, who would seek to represent Serbia in the Eurovision Song Contest 2011.

Kovač died in Belgrade on 13 September 2022, at the age of 80.

References

External links
 
 
 Interview, Blic
 Prva pesma slučajni plagijat, Blic

1942 births
2022 deaths
20th-century Serbian people
Golden Arena winners
Male television composers
Musicians from Niš
Serbian composers
Serbian people of Hungarian descent
Serbian record producers
Serbian rock keyboardists
Serbian television composers